Multistage may refer to:
 Armitage–Doll multistage model of carcinogenesis
 Multistage amplifiers
 Multistage centrifugal pump
 Multi-stage flash distillation
 Multistage interconnection networks
 Multistage rocket
 Multistage sampling
 Multistage testing